Vasily Nikitich Tatishchev (19 April 1686 – 15 July 1750) was a prominent Russian Imperial statesman, historian, philosopher, and ethnographer, best remembered as the author of the first full-scale Russian history and founder of three Russian cities: Stavropol-on-Volga (now Tolyatti), Yekaterinburg, and Perm. Throughout this work, he advocates the idea that autocracy is the perfect form of government for Russia.

Life
A male-line descendant of the 9th-century prince Rurik, Tatischev was born near Pskov on 19 April 1686. Having graduated from the Artillery and Engineering school in Moscow, he took part in the 1700-1721 Great Northern War with Sweden. In the service of Peter the Great he gained a prominent post in the Foreign Office, which he used to oppose the policies of the Supreme Privy Council and support Anna's ascension to the Russian throne in 1730.

He was entrusted by Anna with a lucrative office of the management of Ural factories. At that post he founded the cities of Perm and Yekaterinburg, which have since grown into the veritable capitals of the Urals. A monument to him was opened in Perm in 2003. During the Bashkir War of 1735-40 he was in command of Siberian operations from the winter of 1736-37 and head of the whole operation from the spring of 1737.  He was removed from command after March 1739, nominally on charges of corruption, but mainly because he had made too many enemies. Tatischev finished his official career as a governor of Astrakhan (1741–44). He died at the Boldino estate near Moscow on 15 July 1750.

Work
Having retired from active service, the elderly statesman dedicated himself to scholarly pursuits. Feeling that the Russian historiography had been neglected, he discovered and published several legal monuments of great interest, e.g., Russkaya Pravda and Sudebnik of 1550. His magnum opus was the first sketch of Russian history, entitled Russian History Dating Back to the Most Ancient Times and published in 5 volumes after his death. He also compiled the first encyclopedic dictionary of the Russian language.

The scientific merits of Tatischev's work were disputed even in the 18th century. It is true that he used some chronicles that have since been lost, leading Iakov Lur'e to write of "Tatishchev Information," which he defined as "data unique to that historian," but most of them (notably the Ioachim Chronicle) were of dubious authenticity. It is also true that he could never tell a genuine work from a fake, and some incidents inserted in his history could have been products of his own fancy. Only recently some prominent historians have demonstrated that Tatischev's lost sources may actually be relied on.

Memorialization

Places
Several inhabited locations in Saratov Oblast, Samara Oblast and Orenburg Oblast are named after Tatishchev.

There are Tatishchev Streets in Perm, Yekaterinburg, Chelyabinsk, Kaliningrad, Samara, Buribay and Astrakhan and a Tatishchev Boulevard in Tolyatti.

Monuments
 In September 2003 a monument was erected in honour of V.N. Tatishchev in front of the building of the Solnechnogorsk Local History Museum  - a bust on a polished granite column;
 In 1998 a large equestrian statue of Tatishchev was established in Tolyatti;
 In 2003 on the 280th anniversary of Perm a monument of V.N. Tatishchev, the founder of the city, was erected in a historical place (Razgulyaysky Square that nowadays is named after Tatishchev);
 In the lobby of the Volga University n.a. Tatishchev (Tolyatti) there is a statue of V.N. Tatishchev;
 In Astrakhan there is a garden named after Tatishchev and a bust is installed on the Walk of Fame of Astrakhan land;
 In 1998 in Yekaterinburg at Plotinka (the dam of the city pond on the Iset River) a monument was erected in honour of the founders of Yekaterinburg titled "Glorious sons of Russia V.N. Tatishchev and W. de Gennin, Yekaterinburg is thankful, 1998" (rus. Славным сынам России В. Н. Татищеву и В. И. де Геннину Екатеринбург благодарный 1998 год). The author of the monument is the sculptor Peter Chusovitin.

Other
 An award n.a. Tatishcheva and de Gennin was established in Yekaterinburg and Moscow.
 Mount Tatishchev is the highest point in the territory of modern Yekaterinburg;
 In 1985 a postal envelope dedicated to Tatishchev was issued;
 In 1991 in USSR as part of "Russian historians stamp series" a stamp depicting Vasily Tatishchev was issued;
 A small planet, after being discovered on 27 September 1978 by the Soviet astronomer L.I. Chernykh at the Crimean Astrophysical Observatory, was named after Tatishchev - (4235) Tatishchev;
 The Baltic sailors sail on the ship "Vasily Tatishchev" (this was requested and achieved by the inhabitants of Tolyatti);
 A school competition was named after Tatishchev;
 Gymnasium No. 108 of the city of Yekaterinburg was named after Vasily Tatishchev.

See also 
Tatischev family

References

Bibliography
 Popov N.: Tatischev and His Time. Moscow, 1861.
 Deutch G. M.: Vasily Nikitich Tatischev. Sverdlovsk, 1962.
 Peshtich S. L.: Russian historiography of the 18th century, vol. 1-2. Leningrad, 1961, 1965.
 Anikin, Andréi : Los Pensadores Rusos. Ideas Socioeconómicas en la Rusia de los Siglos XVIII y XIX,Editorial Progreso, pp. 34–37,URRSS, Moscú, 1990.

External links
 Russian biography with a portrait (PDF)
 Tatischev's views on history
 History of Perm

1686 births
1750 deaths
Politicians of the Russian Empire
Writers from the Russian Empire
Russian explorers
Russian city founders
18th-century historians from the Russian Empire
18th-century explorers
Russian ethnographers
Russian military personnel of the Great Northern War
Untitled Rurikids